Governor Bannerman may refer to:

Alexander Bannerman (1788–1864), Governor of Prince Edward Island from 1851 to 1854, Governor of the Bahamas from 1854 to 1857, and Governor of Newfoundland from 1857 to 1864
James Bannerman (1790–1858), Acting Governor of the Gold Coast from 1850 to 1851
John Alexander Bannerman (1759–1819), Governor of Prince of Wales' Island and Province Wellesley in 1817